Lof (Spanish: levo and lov) or caví (Spanish: cahuín); formed the basic social organization of the Mapuche, Mapuche-Huilliche and the extinct Picunche peoples, consisting of a familial clan or lineage that recognizes the authority of a lonco (cacique).  The lof or caví is formed by diverse families that share the same territory and who are considered mutually related, descended from a common ancestor. Several lof form a rehue, and nine rehue formed the aillarehue. These formed one of the 3 or 5 great territorial confederations of the Mapuches, the Butalmapu ("great earth").

The identity of lof was reinforced by the accomplishment of diverse community and festive activities. Lof habitually shared a unique rehue, or Machi's altar, in which the more significant religious ceremonies were performed.

Sources 
 Juan Ignatius Molina, The Geographical, Natural, and Civil History of Chili, London: Longman, Hurst, Rees, and Orme, 1809
  El Pueblo Mapuche; Los Mapuche en la Historia y el Presente

Mapuche society
Social history of Chile
Clans